Thomas Dittrich (born 19 August 1954) is a German hurdler. He competed in the men's 110 metres hurdles at the 1980 Summer Olympics, representing East Germany.

References

1954 births
Living people
People from Zwickau
People from Bezirk Karl-Marx-Stadt
German male hurdlers
Sportspeople from Saxony
Olympic athletes of East Germany
Athletes (track and field) at the 1980 Summer Olympics